The Junior League Softball World Series is a softball tournament for girls aged between 12 and 14. The tournament is administered by Little League Baseball, Inc. and is held annually in the Seattle suburb of Kirkland, Washington.

Tournament format
The tournament started in 1999, and is a true "World Series" since ten regions from around the world send in teams:
 Asia-Pacific
 Canada
 Europe/Africa
 Latin America
 United States (USA) Central
 USA East
 USA South
 USA Southwest
 USA West
 Host team (Washington District 9)

The ten teams are divided into two pools of five members each. The two best teams from each pool then advance to the semi-finals. The winners in the semi-finals play for the championship. All matches are single-elimination games. The losing teams face off in classification games for third through tenth place.

List of champions

Champions per year

Championships per location

4-3 Europa/Africa

See also
Little League Softball World Series
List of Little League Softball World Series champions by division

References

Sources
Juniors Softball World Series official website

 
Little League
Softball competitions
Softball competitions in the United States
Youth softball
Women's sports in the United States
Little League Softball Z
World youth sports competitions
Sports in Washington (state)
Tourist attractions in King County, Washington
Culture of Kirkland, Washington
Recurring sporting events established in 1999